The flag of Groningen is an official symbol of the province. The flag was adopted on 17 February 1950, and is based upon the flag of the town of Groningen and the coat of arms of the region Ommelanden. The colours red, white and blue are derived from the coat of arms of the Ommelanden, and the white and green are shown in the Groningen town flag. The colours of the town are in the centre of the flag to represent the central location of Groningen town, which is the capital of the province.

Design
The ratio of the flag is 2:3, the same as the Dutch flag. The white cross has the width of 1/3 of the height of the flag and the green cross 1/9 of the flag height. The colors are defined as the Pantone-colors 032U (red), 300U (blue) and 355U (green).

History
In the year 1913 Van der Laars did a proposal to use a flag for the province of Groningen. His proposal was a flag that was based upon the flag of the Ommelanden. The blue stripe in the middle was altered to the green of the flag from the city of Groningen. He also did two other proposals where he used the colors of the coat-of-arms of the province of Groningen.

The design of the current flag was made by Jan Tuin, member of the Gedeputeerde Staten of the province of Groningen and later mayor of the city of Groningen. They couldn't agree upon which flag would become the flag of the province. Jan Tuin proposed to design a new flag, this design was accepted. On 17 February 1950 it was decided by Gedeputeerde Staten that this would become the flag of the province of Groningen. Six days later the ruling was officially published.

References

External links 
 

Flags of the Netherlands
Flag
Flags with crosses
Flags introduced in 1950